Indomitable is the second studio album from Leaders. Facedown Records released the album on September 3, 2013. Leaders worked with Seth Munson, in the production of this album.

Critical reception

Awarding the album three stars for HM Magazine, David Stagg states, "While the record isn't anything innovative, it's a heavy offering, and I appreciate heavy." Ian Webber, rating the album an eight out of ten at Cross Rhythms, says, "Indomitable is not really innovative, but it is loud and enjoyable." Giving the album three and a half stars from Jesus Freak Hideout, Aaron Lambert writes, "it's just a stronger album than its predecessor." Lee Brown, indicating in a four star review by Indie Vision Music, describes, "Indomitable is a great album from start to finish, with no filler added."

Track listing

Personnel
Credits for Indomitable  adapted from discogs.

Leaders
Lazarus Rios Jr. – vocals
Josh Reeves – guitar
Jake Dirkson – bass
Johnathen Somner – drums

Production
Produced by Leaders & Seth Munson
Mixed & mastered by Seth Munson
Management by Lazarus Rios Jr.
Publicity by Shannon Quiggle
Booking by Daniel McCartney (The Action Agency)
Artwork & design by Dave Quiggle (davequiggle.com)
Photo by Jesus Ernesto Martinez

References

2013 albums
Leaders (band) albums
Facedown Records albums